Playford International College (formerly known as Fremont-Elizabeth City High School) is a high school in Elizabeth, a northern suburb of Adelaide, South Australia. It’s an amalgamation of three secondary schools in Elizabeth: Playford High School, Fremont High School, and Elizabeth City High School.

Playford offers general secondary education with elite programs in music. It is one among the four Special Interest Music Centres, with those at the then "Fremont High School" set up in 1978, Brighton Secondary School and Marryatville High Schools set up in 1976, and Woodville High School in 1977, covering four distinct geographical areas of Adelaide. It is also one of thirteen Engineering Pathways Schools in South Australia.

History

Elizabeth Girls Technical High School 

The Elizabeth Girls Technical High School was established in Elizabeth East in 1960, providing for students beyond year 7, at a time when the minimum school leaving age was 14. It was renamed Playford High School around 1976 and changed from a girls-only to a co-ed school in 1976. In 1988, it amalgamated with Elizabeth High School. After which the Elizabeth East site was decommissioned.

The name "Playford" was in recognition of Sir Thomas Playford, the state premier whose government established Elizabeth, a reference seen today in the name of the council area which was formed by amalgamating Elizabeth and Munno Para.

Elizabeth Boys Technical High School 

The Elizabeth Boys Technical High School was established in Elizabeth Park in 1960, providing for students beyond year 7. It was renamed Fremont High School after 1975, changed from a boys-only to a co-ed school in 1976, and then amalgamated with Elizabeth City High School in 1995. The Elizabeth Park site was decommissioned in 1996.

The name 'Fremont' was taken from Elizabeth's sister city in California, named after the American explorer John C. Frémont. The reference is also seen today in the name of Fremont Park, between Elizabeth Park and Elizabeth East. The City of Playford no longer maintains this relationship with Fremont, California.

Elizabeth High School 

Elizabeth High School was established at the Philip Highway site in Elizabeth in 1961. It provided general education for students beyond year 7, and preparation for entry to tertiary education. It had a year 8 intake initially, but also a year 9 intake comprising students who had been bussed to Salisbury High School from Elizabeth as year 8 Students in 1960. For 1961 the school was housed completely in temporary classrooms, the new two wing block not occupied until 1962. With the growth of the suburbs, enrolment rapidly outgrew the permanent buildings in the north-eastern corner of the site. By the mid-1960s over half the school was housed in "temporary" buildings extending west. A third wing was added to the "permanent" buildings and enrolment continued to grow to over 2000 students in the latter half of the decade. Enrolment eventually declined with the maturing population of the city and the establishment of another high school in Elizabeth West closer to developing suburbs that had extended northwards into Munno Para.

Playford High School 

In 1988, an amalgamation with Playford High School formed Elizabeth City High School, and the schools were combined at the Philip Highway site.

Fremont-Elizabeth City High School 

In 1995, an amalgamation with Fremont High School formed Fremont-Elizabeth City High School at the Philip Highway site.

Playford International College
In 2016, Fremont-Elizabeth City High School renamed its name as 'Playford International College'. The state government provided $7 million over four years to build a centre for advanced technologies, maths, science, arts, multimedia, and refurbish classrooms. Upgrades were scheduled in 2016/17 and planned to be completed by 2019.

References

External links
 Official site
 Kaurna Plains Aboriginal School
 Engineering Pathways a VET program in South Australian schools
 Department for Education - South Australia 
 Government of South Australia - Building What Matters

 Public schools in South Australia
 Schools of the performing arts in Australia
 Aboriginal schools in the Northern Territory
 Australian schools providing vocational education
 Special interest high schools in South Australia
 Rock Eisteddfod Challenge participants